Harry James Hooman (born 27 April 1991) is an English former footballer who played as a defender.

Playing career
Hooman came through the youth ranks at Shrewsbury Town and signed his first professional contract with the club at the beginning of the 2009/10 season. He made his Shrewsbury Town debut at the age of only 18 against Northampton Town, playing in Shrewsbury Town's 3–0 win.

In November 2010, then 19-year-old Hooman was loaned to Conference North side Hinckley United to gain further first-team experience and became a regular at Hinckley United during his loan spell at the club.

In July 2011 Hooman signed for Cheltenham Town. Having played 7 times for Cheltenham Town in the 2011–12 season, 21-year-old Hooman signed a new one-year deal with the club in June 2012.

Hooman became a regular in the Cheltenham Town starting line-up towards the start of the 2012–13 season, keeping club captain Steve Elliott out of the side. As a result, Hooman won the club's player of the month award for August 2012 and at the time, Cheltenham Town boss Mark Yates described Hooman as "outstanding" and said "he's been a big part of our good start to the season and the shirt is his". Unfortunately, Hooman suffered a foot injury playing for Cheltenham Town in October 2012 and having undergone surgery on it, remained side-lined for the remainder of the season.

Hooman was released by Cheltenham Town in May 2013.

It was announced that Harry would join Inverness Caledonian Thistle for the start of the 2013–2014 season. Unfortunately, a persistent foot injury flared-up in pre-season training resulting in Hooman being released only days after signing for the club. However, Inverness manager Terry Butcher stated that there may be an opportunity for the player to return in the future. However, he was forced into retirement aged just 23 due to constant injuries.

Personal life
He graduated from Manchester Metropolitan University in July 2016 with a bachelor's degree in Sports Science.

References

External links

Living people
English footballers
English Football League players
Shrewsbury Town F.C. players
Hinckley United F.C. players
Cheltenham Town F.C. players
Bath City F.C. players
Association football defenders
1991 births
Sportspeople from Worcester, England
Alumni of Manchester Metropolitan University
Brentford F.C. non-playing staff